The 1976 NC State Wolfpack football team represented North Carolina State University during the 1976 NCAA Division I football season. The Wolfpack were led by first-year head coach Bo Rein and played their home games at Carter Stadium in Raleigh, North Carolina. They competed as members of the Atlantic Coast Conference, finishing in fifth.

Schedule

References

NC State
NC State Wolfpack football seasons
NC State Wolfpack football